Robert Freeman Wexler (born March 12, 1961) is an American writer of surreal fantasy.

Bibliography

Books

 In Springdale Town (PS Publishing, 2003)  (hardback) 1-902880-52-8 (paperback)
 Circus of the Grand Design (Prime Books, 2004) 
 Psychological Methods To Sell Should Be Destroyed (Spilt Milk Press, 2008)
 The Painting and the City (PS Publishing, 2009)
 Undiscovered Territories Short story collection. (PS Publishing, 2021)
 The Silverberg Business (Small Beer Press, 2022)

Stories

 "Suspension" (2001)
 "Tales of the Golden Legend" (2002)
 "Indifference" (2002)
 "The Secret Bag" (2003)
 "Valley of the Falling Clouds" (2003)
 "The Journal of Philip Schuyler" (2004)
 "The Green Wall" (2005)
 “Travels Along an Unfurling Circular Path” (2006)
 “The Sidewalk Factory: A Municipal Romance” (2008)

References

External links
 Official web site
 Interview conducted by Jeff VanderMeer  "There Are No Boundaries: A Conversation with Robert Freeman Wexler.". SF Site November 2004

21st-century American novelists
American male novelists
Living people
1961 births
American male short story writers
21st-century American short story writers
21st-century American male writers